The 2005 Autobacs Super GT Series was the thirteenth season of the Japan Automobile Federation Super GT Championship including the All Japan Grand Touring Car Championship (JGTC) era and the first season as the Super GT series. It is also marked as the twenty-third season of a JAF-sanctioned sports car racing championship dating back to the All Japan Sports Prototype Championship. It is a series for Grand Touring cars divided into 2 classes: GT500 and GT300. The season began on March 27 and ended on November 6, 2005 after 8 races.
The drivers' champions were Yuji Tachikawa and Toranosuke Takagi in GT500; and Kota Sasaki and Tetsuya Yamano in GT300.

Drivers and teams

GT500

GT300

Schedule

Season results

Overall winner in bold

Standings

GT500 class

Drivers' standings
Scoring system

There were no points awarded for pole position and fastest lap in the final race.

Teams' standings
For teams that entered multiple cars, only the best result from each round counted towards the teams' championship.

GT300 class (Top 3)

Drivers

Teams

References

External links

 Super GT official race archive 

Super GT seasons
Super GT